Nokia 6136 is a mobile telephone handset produced by Nokia. It features Generic Access Network (GAN), a technology formerly known as Unlicensed Mobile Access (UMA).

Technical specifications
Quad band GSM / GPRS / EDGE: GSM 850/900/1800/1900
Wi-Fi (IEEE 802.11b/g)
Generic Access Network (automatic switching between WLAN and cellular networks)
1.3 megapixel camera
USB (mini USB)
IrDA
microSD
Stereo FM radio with Visual Radio
Push to Talk over Cellular (PoC)
Runs the Series 40 interface

External links
Official Nokia 6136 page 
 

6136